"They Don't Know" is a song by English production trio Disciples. The song was released in the United Kingdom as a digital download on 20 February 2015 through FFRR Records. The song peaked at number 24 on the UK Singles Chart.

Music video
A music video to accompany the release of "They Don't Know" was first released onto YouTube on 16 January 2015 at a total length of five minutes and four seconds.

The video opens with two teenage boys sharing a cigarette and lying on their backs, with shotguns on their front. The video cuts to a girl of about the same age being raped and assaulted by a thin and bony man. The boys approach and the man sees them and taunts them. While this happens, the girl runs to the man's car and pulls out a holdall. The man then flees with his allies. The girl opens the bag and finds drugs inside. One of the boys gives the girl his coat to warm her up, as the man keeps driving. At dawn, the trio leave the field and continue on their journey. The drug dealer's car pulls up a few kilometres away from the teenagers, and he tracks them out. Sometime later, the teens go to the beach and cool off. As they continue going onwards, the drug dealer finds them and chases them, tackling the girl down. When faced with the barrel of a gun by one of the boys, he tackles him to the ground, choking him with the neck of his gun. The boy's brother shoots in the air to distract the man, and he lets go of the gun. The girl, meanwhile, frantically searches the dealer's bag and pours a powder into her bottle of whisky. She then grabs the bottle and forces it down the man's throat. The man falls unconscious and the children drive away on a tractor. The video ends with one of the brothers trying to kiss the girl, the tractor driver drinking the drugged whisky, and the dealer waking up in a field full of horses.

Track listing

Charts

Certifications

Release history

References

2015 songs
2015 singles